The Baynunah class are corvettes for the United Arab Emirates Navy (UAE Navy). The lead ship, Baynunah, is named after the Baynunah region in Abu Dhabi. Six ships are planned for this class at a total price of US$820 million. Sea trials are currently underway. Platform and combat systems trials are expected to continue through 2011, after which time the lead ship will be delivered to the UAE Navy.

Description
This class is based on the CMN Group's Combattante BR70 design. The Baynunah class is designed for "patrol and surveillance, minelaying, interception and other anti-surface warfare operations in the United Arab Emirate's territorial waters and exclusive economic zone."

History
The lead ship, Baynunah, was built in France by Constructions Mécaniques de Normandie, while the rest are being built in the UAE by Abu Dhabi Ship Building (ADSB).

The lead ship was launched on 25 June 2009. Sea trials commenced in January 2010..

The fourth ship of the class, Mezyad, was launched by ADSB on 15 February 2012. ADSB hopes to secure further orders for the class from the Saudi and Kuwaiti navies (but Saudi and Kuwaiti are not interested anymore).

The last ship, Al-Hili, was launched on 6 February 2014.

During the Saudi Arabian-led intervention in the Yemeni Civil War, a number of the class took part in a naval blockade of Yemen.

Ships

See also

References

External links
 Abu Dhabi Ship Building
 Constructions Mécaniques de Normandie's Combattante BR70 web page
 National Defense Magazine article

Corvette classes
Corvettes of the United Arab Emirates
Corvettes of the United Arab Emirates Navy